Sahara is a Bangladeshi film actress. She made her debut through the film Rukhe Darao in 2004 with Shakib Khan. Her career lasted from 2003 to 2013, the year her last movie was released. She did not sign any movie contract after that and is thought to have retired after getting married in 2015.

Career

Shahara started her career in 2004 with the film Rukhe Darao. Shahara was a superb addition to Bangladeshi film industry during the days action films in the middle part of last decade. Her start in the film industry was not a smooth ride. "Rukhe Darao", her first movie, did not do well in the box office as she was deemed to be too conservative for films.  She was under pressure to change this tag and appeared in a bolder role in her next movie "Varate Khuni".  She then signed several new action films, the most coveted genre of that era. One of them named "Bishakto Chokh", a big budget movie starring super star Rubel and Riaz.  She landed several roles as a glamour girl.

In 2008, she  starred in blockbuster "Priya Amar Priya".

Filmography

See also
 Symon Sadik
 Mahiya Mahi
 Bappy Chowdhury

References

Living people
Bangladeshi film actresses
People from Dhaka
Year of birth missing (living people)